Norman Borlaug, or Dr. Norman E. Borlaug, is a bronze sculpture depicting the American agronomist and humanitarian of the same name by Benjamin Victor, installed in the United States Capitol's National Statuary Hall, in Washington, D.C., as part of the National Statuary Hall Collection. The statue was donated by the U.S. state of Iowa in 2014, and replaced one depicting James Harlan, which the state had gifted in 1910.

See also
 2014 in art

References

External links
 

2014 establishments in Washington, D.C.
Bronze sculptures in Washington, D.C.
Monuments and memorials in Washington, D.C.
Borlaug
Sculptures of men in Washington, D.C.